Magomed Mustafayevich Ozdoyev (born 5 November 1992) is a Russian professional footballer who plays as a central midfielder for Turkish club Fatih Karagümrük.

Personal life
Magomed Ozdoyev was born in Grozny, into an Ingush family, during the year of 1992, but had been forced to abandon Chechnya as for the result of the First Chechen War, which Russian military engaged against Chechen separatists supporting the Chechen Republic of Ichkeria, during these times, his football passion was cherished and tutored under his father, Mustafa. It was considered as the hardest experience for Magomed himself, in an appearance on Russia-1's program in 2017, prior to 2018 FIFA World Cup.

Magomed himself is the grandnephew of the late Ingush World War II ace who served in the Red Army, Murad Ozdoev.

Club career
He made his Russian Premier League debut on 10 July 2010 for Lokomotiv Moscow in a game against FC Anzhi Makhachkala.
On 14 July 2014, Ozdoyev was loaned by Lokomotiv Moscow to Russian Football Premier League rivals Rubin Kazan for 1 year with buying option.

On 13 February 2017, he was loaned by Rubin Kazan to FC Terek Grozny until the end of the 2016–17 season.

On 15 February 2018, he signed a 4.5-year contract with Zenit St. Petersburg. On 25 May 2022, Ozdoyev left Zenit as his contract expired.

On 28 July 2022, Ozdoyev joined Fatih Karagümrük in Turkey.

International career
On 11 May 2012, Ozdoyev was named to the Russia's provisional squad for the UEFA Euro 2012. It was the first time he was called up to the national team. He was not included on the final official squad for the competition. He has become the first Ingush to be called to the Russian national team. He made his national team debut on 3 September 2014 in a friendly against Azerbaijan. He scored his first national team goal on 15 November 2016 in a friendly against Romania which finished as a 1–0 victory for Russia in the city of Grozny, where he was born.

On 11 May 2021, he was included in the preliminary extended 30-man squad for UEFA Euro 2020. On 2 June 2021, he was included in the final squad, making history as the first Caucasian Muslim footballer to represent the Russian side in a major competition. He played the full match in Russia's opening game against Belgium on 12 June 2021 as Russia lost 0–3. He again started and was substituted after an hour of play each time in the second game against Finland on 16 June in a 1–0 victory and the last group stage game against Denmark as Russia lost 1–4 and was eliminated.

International goals
Scores and results list Russia's goal tally first.

Career statistics

Notes

Honours
Zenit Saint Petersburg
Russian Premier League: 2018–19, 2019–20, 2020–21, 2021–22
Russian Cup: 2019–20
Russian Super Cup: 2020, 2021

References

External links
 

Russian people of Chechen descent
1992 births
Living people
Russian Muslims
Russian footballers
Sportspeople from Grozny
Association football midfielders
Russia youth international footballers
Russia under-21 international footballers
Russia international footballers
Russian Premier League players
FC Angusht Nazran players
FC Akhmat Grozny players
FC Dynamo Kyiv players
FC Lokomotiv Moscow players
FC Rubin Kazan players
FC Zenit Saint Petersburg players
Fatih Karagümrük S.K. footballers
Ukrainian Premier League players
UEFA Euro 2020 players
Ingush people
Russian expatriate footballers
Russian expatriate sportspeople in Ukraine
Expatriate footballers in Ukraine
Russian expatriate sportspeople in Turkey
Expatriate footballers in Turkey